Pygmaepterys bellini is a species of sea snail, a marine gastropod mollusk in the family Muricidae, the murex snails or rock snails.

Description

Distribution
The type specimen was collected off of Okinawa, Japan.

References

External links
  D'Attilio A. & Myers B.W. (1985). A new species of Pygmaepterys Vokes from the western Pacific (Gastropoda: Muricidae). The Nautilus. 99(1): 9-13.

Muricidae
Gastropods described in 1985